The 2014 Bulgarian Supercup was the 12th Bulgarian Supercup, an annual Bulgarian football match played between the winners of the previous season's A Football Group and Bulgarian Cup. The game was played between the champions of the 2013–14 A PFG, Ludogorets Razgrad, and the 2014 Bulgarian Cup runners-up, Botev Plovdiv, since Ludogorets won both trophies. 

This was Ludogorets's third Bulgarian Supercup appearance and Botev's first. Watched by a crowd of 5,500 at Lazur Stadium in Burgas, Ludogorets won the match 3–1 (thus securing a treble), with goals from Virgil Misidjan, Marcelinho and Hamza Younés, after Milen Gamakov had put Botev 1–0 up at half-time.

Match overview
The first half was relatively even and saw both teams creating a number of good chances. Milen Gamakov opened the scoring in the 18th minute after Plamen Nikolov lay the ball in his path with a header following a foul (taken by Marian Ognyanov) that had been awarded to Botev Plovdiv. Just before half-time, Aleksandar Kolev had a claim for a penalty turned down by referee Nikolay Yordanov and was subsequently sent off for a second yellow card, presumably for a comment directed at the official. The official's decision was vociferously disputed by the Botev Plovdiv players and technical staff, with Adam Stachowiak receiving a caution for dissent. In the second half, Ludogorets Razgrad dominated the game, while Botev Plovdiv focused on the well-organized defense. Virgil Misidjan equalized the score in the 53rd minute after being picked out by Marcelinho and managing to get past Filip Filipov. Five minutes before the end of regular time, Marcelinho gave the team from Razgrad a 2:1 lead following a Hristo Zlatinski assist. In the 88th minute, Vladislav Stoyanov pulled off a save from a powerful header by Plamen Nikolov, after Ivan Tsvetkov has found an opening in the champions' defense. New signing and former yellow and blacks' forward Hamza Younés sealed the win for Ludogorets Razgrad in the closing stages of the match courtesy of another assist from Marcelinho.

Match details

Post-match reactions

In the aftermath of the match, Nikolay Yordanov's refereeing performance was severely criticized by manager Velislav Vutsov, Botev players, the management and fans, with the dismissal of Aleksandar Kolev viewed as the most controversial episode in the game. Aleksandar Kolev insisted that he had been fouled, denied having demanded a penalty kick, and even briefly considered retiring from football. Ludogorets were also lambasted by Botev supporters for supposedly having influenced the nature of the officiating. Ludogorets' executive director Angel Petrichev congratulated Botev Plovdiv for making it a tight match and agreed that it would have been better for the game if the referee had not shown a red card, while also maintaining that the whole blame should not be apportioned to Yordanov. Ludogorets manager Georgi Dermendzhiev did not sympathize with Botev Plovdiv's complaints against the referee and maintained that Ludogorets had managed to win without "giving it a 100%", but praised the young players of the opposing team. After the match, the referee's officiating rights were temporarily suspended.

References

2014
Supercup
Botev Plovdiv matches
PFC Ludogorets Razgrad matches